Trophocosta is a genus of moths belonging to the subfamily Tortricinae of the family Tortricidae.

Species
Trophocosta argyrosperma (Diakonoff, 1953)
Trophocosta aurea Razowski, 1966
Trophocosta conchodes (Meyrick, 1910)
Trophocosta cyanoxantha (Meyrick, 1907)
Trophocosta hilarochroma (Diakonoff, 1951)
Trophocosta maculifera Kuznetzov, 1992
Trophocosta nitens Razowski, 1964
Trophocosta nummifera (Meyrick, 1910)
Trophocosta tucki Razowski, 1986

See also
List of Tortricidae genera

References

 , 2005: World catalogue of insects volume 5 Tortricidae

External links
tortricidae.com

Tortricini
Tortricidae genera